Louis Charles Dezobry (4 March 1798 – 16 August 1871) was a 19th-century French historian and historical novelist, born at St-Denis.

Works 
 Rome au siècle d'Auguste, ou Voyage d'un Gaulois à Rome à l'époque du règne d'Auguste et pendant une partie du règne de Tibère (1835) Inline
 La Mauvaise récolte, ou les Suites de l'ignorance (1847)
 L'Histoire en peinture, ou Épisodes historiques propres à être traduits en tableaux. Histoire romaine. Tableaux d'histoire, passages historiques, tableaux de genre (1848)
 Dictionnaire général de biographie et d'histoire, de mythologie, de géographie ancienne et moderne comparée, des antiquités et des institutions grecques, romaines françaises et étrangères, with Théodore Bachelet (1863)
 Référence:Dictionnaire général des lettres, des beaux-arts et des sciences morales et politiques (Bachelet et Dezobry)|Dictionnaire général des lettres, des beaux-arts et des sciences morales et politiques, en collaboration avec Théodore Bachelet (1863)
Dictionnaire pratique et critique de l'art épistolaire français, avec des préceptes et des conseils sur chaque genre ; plus de mille modèles choisis dans les monuments et les documents de la langue française, et des remarques sur chaque lettre (1866)
 Traité élémentaire de versification française, suivi d'un album alphabétique des vers proverbes français (1866)

External links 
 Charles Dezobry on data.bnf.fr

19th-century French historians
Historians of ancient Rome
French historical novelists
People from Saint-Denis, Seine-Saint-Denis
1798 births
1871 deaths
19th-century French novelists